Sugar en aprietos is a 2022 Peruvian comedy film written, directed and produced by José Salinas. Starring David Zepeda and Alessandra Fuller. It premiered on October 6, 2022, in Peruvian theaters.

Synopsis 
Mariana, a talkative and fun young woman who has the opportunity to be sent to university thanks to the charity of a benefactor who sponsors the city's municipal orphanage where she has lived all her life and is an assistant to the institution.

Cast 
The actors participating in this film are:

 Alessandra Fuller
 David Zepeda
 Patricia Portocarrero
 Yvonne Frayssinet
 Maju Mantilla
 Andrés Vílchez
 Joaquín Escobar
 Andrea Luna
 Haydeé Cáceres
 Olga Zumarán
 Kukuli Morante
 Valeria Piazza
 Austin Palao
 Ricardo Rondón
 Tito Vega
 Leslie Stewart
 Javier Valdés
 José Dammert
 Matías Raygada
 Mariano Ramírez

References 

2022 films
2022 comedy films
Peruvian comedy films
2020s Spanish-language films
2020s Peruvian films
Films set in Peru
Films shot in Peru